Slamboree was a professional wrestling pay-per-view (PPV) event from World Championship Wrestling (WCW) held from 1993 through 2000. It was originally billed as "A Legends' Reunion" because many retired legends from Jim Crockett Promotions attended the PPV and other events scheduled for that weekend. The first three Slamborees included inductions into the WCW Hall of Fame and also included matches with the legends participating. 

Since 2014, all Slamboree events are available on the WWE Network. WWE acquired the "Slamboree" trademark upon the sale of WCW's intellectual properties in 2001 which it allowed the trademark to expire in 2005. In November 2019, Cody Rhodes filed to claim the Slamboree trademark. In November of 2020, a settlement was reached between Cody Rhodes and WWE in which Cody gained the "Cody Rhodes" trademark, which WWE had held onto after his run in that company, in exchange for WWE gaining the WCW event name trademarks that Cody had claimed, including Slamboree.

Dates, venues and main events

References

 
Recurring events established in 1993
Recurring events disestablished in 2000